Uwaymir ibn Zayd ibn Qays al-Khazraji, better known as Abu al-Darda al-Ansari (d. 32 AH/652 CE) was a companion of the Islamic prophet Muhammad who was known for being a leading authority on, and teacher of, the Quran and as the first qadi of Damascus. He was the husband of fellow companion Umm al-Darda al-Kubra.

Biography
Abu al-Darda's name was Uwaymir ibn Zayd ibn Qays ibn A'isha ibn Umayya, though his given name may have been Amir and his father's name is also given in the sources as Tha'laba, Amir, Abd Allah and Malik. He belonged to the Balharith family of the Khazraj tribe of Yathrib. The Islamic prophet Muhammad emigrated from Mecca to Yathrib, which thenceforth became known as 'Medina'. He was embraced by the Khazraj and its brother tribe, the Banu Aws, and the two tribes collectively became known as the Ansar ('Helpers'), in distinction to the Muhajirun ('Emigrants'), the term for Muhammad's fellow emigrants from Mecca. 

Although most of his family converted to Islam soon after Muhammad made Medina his seat, Abu al-Darda, then a youth, did not convert until after the Muslim victory against Muhammad's tribe and erstwhile opponents, the Quraysh, at the Battle of Badr in 624. He is generally considered a companion of Muhammad, though a number of Muslim authorities question this status. He may have participated alongside the Muslims against the Quraysh at the Battle of Uhud in 627. When Muhammad designated brotherhoods between the Ansar and Muhajirun, Abu al-Darda was made a 'brother' of Salman al-Farisi.

A claim traced to Abu al-Darda held that he was a merchant before his conversion, but afterward abandoned commercial pursuits as it detracted from his devotion to religious duties. Later Islamic tradition described him as an ascetic, pietist, and zahid. He is credited by this tradition for being the sage of the early Muslim community. Abu Darda's principal authority derived from his knowledge of the Quran, being one the few individuals who collected Quranic revelations from Muhammad during the latter's lifetime.

Under the instruction of Caliph Umar, the overall governor of Islamic Syria, Mu'awiya ibn Abi Sufyan, appointed Abu al-Darda the first qadi of Damascus, Syria's chief city. There, he often assembled students at the city's mosque to instruct them in the Quran. He is thus considered the true father of the Damascus School, according to the historian Arthur Jeffery. He died in Damascus in 652 and was buried alongside his wife, Umm al-Darda, at the city's Bab al-Saghir gate.

Legacy
According to the historian Steven Judd, "for nearly a century, Abu al-Darda and his students dominated the office of qadi in Damascus". His student and chosen successor, Fadala ibn Ubayd al-Ansari, served until his death in 673. All the qadis of Damascus during Umayyad rule (661–750), at least until the 740s, were either students of Abu al-Darda, or were taught by Abu al-Darda's students. His son, Bilal, was the qadi in 679–684, while two other students, Abu Idris al-Khawlani and Numayr ibn Aws al-Ash'ari, respectively served in the same office in 684–699 and post-718–. Toward the end of the Umayyad period, Abu al-Darda's influence became less direct; his student, Sa'id ibn al-Musayyab, instructed the pro-Umayyad scholars Ibn Shihab al-Zuhri and Makhul al-Shami, both of whom, in turn, were teachers of later Syrian scholars al-Awza'i and Yazid ibn Abd al-Rahman.

See also

References

Bibliography

652 deaths
7th-century Arabs
Ansar (Islam)
Sahabah who participated in the battle of Uhud
Sahabah hadith narrators
Scholars of the medieval Islamic world
People of medieval Syria
People from the Rashidun Caliphate